Eutetranychus is a genus of mites belonging to the family Tetranychidae.

The genus has almost cosmopolitan distribution.

Species:

Eutetranychus acaciae 
Eutetranychus africanus 
Eutetranychus anitae 
Eutetranychus banksi 
Eutetranychus bilobatus 
Eutetranychus bredini 
Eutetranychus caricae 
Eutetranychus carinae 
Eutetranychus citri 
Eutetranychus clastus 
Eutetranychus concertativus 
Eutetranychus cratis 
Eutetranychus eliei 
Eutetranychus enodes 
Eutetranychus fici 
Eutetranychus guangdongensis 
Eutetranychus maximae 
Eutetranychus mirpuriensis 
Eutetranychus nagai 
Eutetranychus namibianus 
Eutetranychus neotranversus 
Eutetranychus nomurai 
Eutetranychus orientalis 
Eutetranychus palmatus 
Eutetranychus pantopus 
Eutetranychus papayensis 
Eutetranychus phaseoli 
Eutetranychus pruni 
Eutetranychus pyri 
Eutetranychus rhusi 
Eutetranychus ricinus 
Eutetranychus sanaae 
Eutetranychus shii
Eutetranychus swazilandicus 
Eutetranychus transverstriatus 
Eutetranychus xianensis

References

Acari